Legislative elections were held in El Salvador in January 1928. The result was a victory for the National Democratic Party, which won all 42 seats.

Results

References

El Salvador
1928 in El Salvador
Election and referendum articles with incomplete results
Legislative elections in El Salvador